The 1971–72 British Home Championship was the first such Home Nations football tournament (although not the last), to suffer during The Troubles in Northern Ireland, when death threats from the Provisional Irish Republican Army were sent to the Scottish Football Association and Scottish players who were scheduled to play at Windsor Park. The surge in anti-British feeling which prompted these threats followed Bloody Sunday in January, and also resulted in the cancellation of the rugby union 1972 Five Nations Championship. As a result, Northern Ireland's home fixture was rescheduled to Hampden Park, effectively granting the Scottish team an extra home match. This was not the last time that The Troubles would interfere with the Home Championship; the 1981 British Home Championship would have to be abandoned following similar heightened tension after the death of Bobby Sands.

Scotland used their home advantage well, securing victory over the Irish and Welsh to take a major points advantage into the final match against England, who had lost at home to Northern Ireland following a heavy defeat of Wales. In the last match however, England gained a slight advantage over their old rivals, winning 1–0 and thus equalling the tournament on points and resulting in a shared victory (goal difference was not at this stage used to differentiate between teams). The Welsh salvaged a point in their final home game to Northern Ireland, but still finished bottom of the table.

Table

Results

References

External links
Full Results and Line-ups

1972
1972 in British sport
1971–72 in Northern Ireland association football
1971–72 in English football
1971–72 in Welsh football
1971–72 in Scottish football